A number of steamships have been named Planter, including –
 , a British cargo ship torpedoed and sunk in November 1940
 , a British refrigerated cargo liner in service 1946–58

Ship names